The 12433 / 12434 Chennai Central – Hazrat Nizamuddin Rajdhani Express is an important train connecting Chennai & New Delhi. According to 1997-98 railway budget, pantry car service was introduced on 2633/2634 (number of that time) Hazrat Nizamuddin-Chennai Rajdhani Express in 1996-97 and maybe it was introduced then (1996–97) . Thiruvananthapuram Rajdhani Express used to terminate at Madras (Chennai) Central and presently avoids Chennai and it is older than the current Chennai Rajdhani Express and this Thiruvananthapuram Rajdhani Express was first introduced in 1993 and runs twice a week from Delhi and twice from Chennai. The Chennai Rajdhani is a fast alternative to the classic Grand Trunk Express and the modern Superfast Tamil Nadu Express. The Chennai Rajdhani Express covers a distance of 2176 kilometers in 28 hours 10 minutes as compared to 33 hours and 5 min covered by Tamil Nadu Express and 35 hours and 15 minutes taken by Grand Trunk Express. It gets WAP4 from SCR's Vijaywada electric shed. It shares the record of being the second fastest train between Chennai Central and  covering the distance of 2175 km in 28 hours and 10 minutes as Chennai Duronto covering the 2174 km journey in 27 hours and 55 minutes but in return it does not happen.

Train
The train get highest priority on the Indian railway network and is fully air-conditioned. Passengers are provided with complimentary meals during the journey. Depending on the timings of the train, lunch, high tea, dinner, morning tea, and breakfast are served. The trains offer three classes of accommodation; First Class AC with 2 or 4 berth lockable bedrooms, AC 2-tier with open system berths (bays of 4 berths + 2 berths on the side) but provided with curtains for privacy, AC 3-tier (bays of 6 berths + 2 berths on the side) without curtains.

Passengers travelling on the First AC class in this train are treated with luxury. They get their own private cabin, music stereos, scent emitters and a four-course dinner.

The Chennai Rajdhani Express runs at an average speed of 77.24 km/h,. This train now runs with the new LHB rakes, which were introduced in 2012.

Traction
It is hauled by a Royapuram / Lallaguda based WAP-7 locomotive from end to end.

Route & Halts

Coach composition
This train has 9 AC Three tier,5 AC Two Tier,1 AC First Class,1 pantry car & 2 luggage cum generator coaches taking the total to 18 LHB coach. It shares its rake with Thiruvananthapuram Rajdhani Express and Secunderabad Rajdhani Express and Madgaon Rajdhani Express

Timetable

The 12433 Rajdhani Express leaves Chennai Central in the morning of Friday and Sunday at 06:05 and reaches Hazrat Nizamuddin at 10:30 in the morning of the next day. On the return journey, the 12434 Chennai Rajdhani leaves Hazrat Nizamuddin at 15:35 on Wednesday and Friday and reaches Chennai Central at 20:45 in the evening of the next day.

Speed
The maximum permissible speed is up to 130 km/h but it is lower in some parts. Its all coaches are of air conditioned LHB coach type which is capable of reaching 160 km/h but it does not touch. Sometimes people become confused because according to Indian Railways Permanent Way Manual (IRPWM) on its website or Indian Railway Institute of Civil Engineering website, the BG (Broad Gauge) lines have been classified into six groups 'A' to 'E' on the basis of the future maximum permissible speeds but it may not be same as present speed.

The maximum permissible speed of the train or the route is 120 km/h between H. Nizamuddin and Tuglakabad where RDSO has been requested to corroborate the track quality fit for raising sectional speed to 130 km/h. The maximum permissible speed of the train is 130 km/h in Tuglakabad (TKD) –  Palwal (PWL) – Mathura (MTJ) route where it is slower than the fastest train of the route having speed of 160 km/h. After leaving the common route towards Mumbai, maximum permissible speed of the train is 130 km/h in Mathura (MTJ) – Agra Cantt (AGC) route where it is slower than the fastest train of the route having speed of 160 km/h. The maximum permissible speed of the train or the route is 130 km/h in Agra Cantt (AGC)  – DHO –  Jhansi – Lalitpur (LAR) route but increasing of speed of H. Nizamuddin – Jhansi Gatimaan Express up to 160 km/h is planned between Agra Cantt and Jhansi and the proposed speed is higher than this Chennai Rajdhani Express train. The maximum permissible speed of the train or the route is 120 km/h in Lalitpur (LAR) – Bina – Jujharpur (JHP) (Near Itarsi) route where proposal for raising of speed up to 130 km/h is under preparation. The maximum permissible speed of the train or the route is 120 km/h between Jujharpur (JHP) and Balharshah (BPQ) except Dharakhoh – Maramijhiri, Chichonda – Teegaon hilly areas. The maximum permissible speed of the train or the route will be increased to 130 km/h very soon or it might have been already increased in Ballarshah (BPQ) – Kazipet (KZJ) – Gudur (GDR) route. The maximum permissible speed of the tran and the route is increased to 130 km/h from 110 in Gudur (GDR) – Basin bridge – MGR Chennai Central (MAS) (fast lines between Basin Bridge and Chennai Central are taken) route recently (Press Release on Southern Railway website on 07, Oct 2022).

Gallery

References

External links

 List of all Rajdhani trains
Chennai Rajdhani Schedule & Route Map

Transport in Chennai
Transport in Delhi
Rajdhani Express trains
Rail transport in Tamil Nadu
Rail transport in Delhi
Rail transport in Andhra Pradesh
Rail transport in Telangana
Rail transport in Maharashtra
Rail transport in Madhya Pradesh
Rail transport in Uttar Pradesh
Railway services introduced in 1993